David and Jonathan were a British pop duo from Bristol, England, featuring Roger Greenaway and Roger Cook. They had two top 20 hits in 1966.

They began working together in 1965 in Bristol, England, and wrote the hit songs "This Golden Ring" and "You've Got Your Troubles" for the British group the Fortunes. They teamed with George Martin to do a cover of the Beatles' "Michelle", which was a hit single in 1966 in both the UK (No. 11 UK Singles Chart) and the U.S. (Billboard Hot 100 No. 18, U.S. AC No. 3). They had a top 10 in the UK in 1966 with "Lovers of the World Unite", which reached No. 7. The stage names "David and Jonathan" presumably come from the ancient Hebrew king David and prince Jonathan, whose close personal friendship was documented in the First Book of Samuel.

David and Jonathan sang the main title theme (composed by Johnny Dankworth), for the eponymously titled spy-spoof film, Modesty Blaise.

After David and Jonathan had run its course, the duo formed The Congregation and also continued to write successful hit singles both alone and together, for artists such as Blue Mink, the Hollies, Engelbert Humperdinck, Whistling Jack Smith, Bobby Goldsboro and others.

Discography

Singles

Albums 
 David and Jonathan (UK) (1966)
 Michelle (USA) (1966)
 The Very Best of David and Jonathan (Germany) (1967)
 Lovers of the World Unite (1984)

See also 
 List of 1960s one-hit wonders in the United States
 RPM number-one hits of 1966
 List of bands from Bristol
 Culture of Bristol

Notes

References 

English pop music duos
Musical groups from Bristol
Musical groups established in 1965